In engineering, a design choice is a possible solution to a problem. Given a design task and a governing set of criteria (design specifications), several conceptual designs may be drafted. Each of these preliminary concepts is a potential design choice. Many never advance beyond the preliminary phase; those that are developed to the point at which they could be applied become the pool from which the final selection is made. This process stems from the principle that there is usually no uniquely right way of accomplishing any task. The final selection is often made on a financial basis; i.e., the least expensive design is chosen in a bid process.  

In civil engineering, design choices typically derive from basic principles of materials science and structural design. A suspension bridge, for example, uses the fact that steel is extremely efficient in tension, while a prestressed concrete bridge takes advantage of concrete's relatively low cost by weight and its ability to sustain high compressive loading (see compression).

Engineering concepts
Design